The Diocese of Ferns is a Roman Catholic diocese in south-eastern Ireland. It is one of three suffragan dioceses in the ecclesiastical province of Dublin and is subject to the Archdiocese of Dublin. The incumbent Ordinary is Gerard Nash.

Geographical remit
The See covers most of County Wexford and some of County Carlow and County Wicklow. The major towns are Enniscorthy, Gorey, New Ross and Wexford, along with its namesake town of Ferns.

It is a suffragan of the Roman Catholic Archdiocese of Dublin.

History

W. H. Grattan Flood, author of the History of the Diocese of Ferns, illustrates the origin of the Diocese, by stating:

Ordinaries

The following is a list of the most recent post-Reformation Roman Catholic bishops and vicars apostolic.

 Thomas Furlong (1857–1875)
 Michael Warren (1876–1884)
 James Browne (1884–1917)
 William Codd (1917–1938)
 James Staunton (1938–1963)
 Donal Herlihy (1964–1983)
 Brendan Oliver Comiskey, SS.CC. (1984–2002)
 Denis Brennan (2006–2021)
 Gerard Nash (2021–present)

Sex abuse controversy

The October 2005 Report of the Ferns Inquiry has outlined the serious levels of clerical sex abuse in the diocese since the 1960s. It strongly criticised the former bishops of Ferns, Donal Herlihy and Brendan Comiskey for their inability to deal with the allegations of sexual abuse made against a number of priests. Comiskey resigned as Bishop on 1 April 2002.

See also
 St. Aidan's Cathedral
 Catholic Church in Ireland

References

Sources
Grattan Flood, W.H. History of the Diocese of Ferns. Waterford: Downey & Co., 1916.

External links
Ferns.ie – Official site
Diocese of Ferns (GCatholic.org)
Catholic-Hierarchy.org – Diocese Profile

 
Ferns
Ferns, Diocese of
6th-century establishments in Ireland
Religion in County Wexford
Enniscorthy
Religion in County Wicklow
Roman Catholic Ecclesiastical Province of Dublin